Mortimer Edward Hogan (February 1862 – March 17, 1923) was an American outfielder in Major League Baseball. He started his professional career in 1883 with the Peoria Reds. He played in the Union Association in 1884 and in the American Association in 1887–1888.

Sources

1862 births
1923 deaths
19th-century baseball players
Major League Baseball outfielders
Milwaukee Brewers (UA) players
New York Metropolitans players
Cleveland Blues (1887–88) players
Milwaukee Brewers (minor league) players
Peoria Reds players
Memphis Reds players
Cleveland Forest Cities players
Elmira Colonels players
Leavenworth Soldiers players
Augusta Browns players
Atlanta Atlantas players
Nashville Blues players
Baseball players from Illinois